is a private junior college in Okazaki, Aichi, Japan.

History and outline 
The school was founded in 1912 as a school called . It was chartered as a junior college in 1950 and renamed . In 1966, the college foundation, Anjō Gakuen Educational Corporation, established Aichi Gakusen University. In April 1982, the junior college was renamed . The junior college became coeducational in 2001.

References

External links 
 

Educational institutions established in 1950
Japanese junior colleges
Private universities and colleges in Japan
Universities and colleges in Aichi Prefecture
Okazaki, Aichi
1950 establishments in Japan